The Belt is a 1989 Italian erotic drama film directed by  Giuliana Gamba. It is based on the drama play with the same name by Alberto Moravia.

Cast 
Eleonora Brigliadori: Bianca Ravelli
James Russo: Vittorio Di Simone
Giuliana Calandra: Bianca's Mother 
Riccardo Salvino: Prof. Achille Biondelli
Anna Bonaiuto: The Judge 
Lidia Broccolino: Bianca's Friend 
Ivano Marescotti: Friend of Bianca's Mother

References

External links

1989 films
Italian erotic drama films
BDSM in films
1980s erotic drama films
Films based on works by Alberto Moravia
1989 crime drama films
Films scored by Nicola Piovani
1980s Italian-language films
1980s Italian films